Dick Simon is an American entrepreneur, social enterprise philanthropist, photographer and speaker, best known for his work with psychedelic medicines and as co-Founder and Chair of the Young Presidents' Organization (YPO) Peace Action Network (PAN).

Psychedelic Medicines
Dick Simon works to destigmatize and create acceptance of psychedelic medicines for mental health, supporting research centers, nonprofits, and other ventures working to advance those causes.  He is Co-Founder and Boardmember of the Boston Psychedelic Research Group, Chairman of the Advisory Council for the Center for the Neuroscience of Psychedelics at Massachusetts General Hospital, Founder and Chair of the YPO Psychedelic Medicines for Mental Health Group, and on the Steering Committee for the Psychedelic Science Funders Collaborative.

YPO-WPO Peace Action Network
Simon is also the CEO of RSI, Inc., a Boston-based real estate development and investment management company.  Based on his business activity, in 1998 Simon joined the Young/World Presidents' Organization (YPO-WPO), an organization of over 24,000 CEO members in more than 150 countries whose combined businesses generate over 10% of the world's GDP.  Following his experiences on a yearlong, around-the-world trip he took with his wife and children in 1999, when the children were 6, 8 and 10 years old, and in the aftermath of September 11, 2001, Simon realized he could make a difference through YPO-WPO by connecting international CEOs from opposite sides of conflict regions to address stereotypes and misconceptions of the other.  Simon co-created YPO-WPO's Peace Action Network to promote conflict resolution by engaging these business leaders on the opposite sides of conflicts such as Palestine/Israel, India/Pakistan, U.S/Middle East and Jewish/Arab-Muslim Americans, through the use of Forums, intimate and confidential groups of CEOs that are facilitated by a trained moderator. Simon also organizes and leads delegations of international CEOs to countries that are traditionally difficult to access and understood only as adversaries in the West, such as North Korea, Iran, Syria and Cuba, in order to meet with business, political, and religious leaders to hear local perspectives and their narratives of conflict.  Simon’s work in YPO-WPO and PAN has earned him a place on Real Leaders Magazine's list of "100 Visionary Leaders" and recognitions including YPO Global Humanitarian Award 2004, YPO Innovation and New Frontier Forum Awards 2003, and YPO Best of the Best 2005. In addition, Simon received Harvard Business School’s Making a Difference Award in 2005.

Iran Delegations
Since 2013, as a part of PAN, Simon has led three delegations of international CEOs to Iran.  The 2015 delegation included the first American business leaders to meet with an Iranian Minister  and the first American group to be allowed to return to the former US Embassy in Tehran, Iran since the Iranian Hostage Crisis immediately following the Iranian Revolution.  As a result, American members of the group were called upon to brief the US Senate Foreign Relations and Senate Banking Committees, as well as senior officials at the State Department.

Photographer and Speaker
During his world travels, Simon has photographed and gathered the stories of people on all sides of geopolitical and religious divides in areas such as the Middle East, Korean Peninsula, Myanmar, Rwanda, Guatemala, and Cuba, among others.  His images and stories have been exhibited in venues such as Danforth Museum of Art and Griffin Museum of Photography, and he gives presentations about his experiences to TEDx, RiseUp Egypt, as well as universities, museums and community, religious, and business organizations around the world.  He also regularly speaks to media about his work and issues of business and conflict resolution, including CBS Radio, Public Radio International, NPR/PBS,  Boston Globe, New York Times, and BBC Persia.

kNOw THEM Initiative
In 2012, Simon launched the kNOw THEM Initiative.  The kNOw THEM Initiative raises individual and collective awareness about the power and danger of THEM, which Simon views as the most dangerous four-letter word in the English language for its ability to marginalize, dehumanize and create conflict. Ambassadors for the kNOw THEM Initiative include Martin Luther King III, Dr. Naif Al-Mutawa, Ambassador Swanee Hunt, Craig Kielburger and Marc Kielburger, Gary Knight, Liz Murray, Zainab Salbi, and Zade Dirani.

References

American photographers
American businesspeople
Year of birth missing (living people)
Living people